An informant is a person who provides privileged information to an agency.

Informant may also refer to:

Informant (linguistics), a native speaker who provides information about their language for linguistics study
Informant (psychiatry), a third party who can report on a psychiatric case for a doctor

See also
Informer (disambiguation)
The Informant (disambiguation)